GHSA may refer to:

 Georgia High School Association
 Global Health Security Agenda, international effort operating in the field on infection prevention and control
 GitHub Security Advisory, a computer security disclosure.